The Collegian is the student newspaper of the University of Richmond. Founded in 1914, the publication is staffed by members of the Richmond journalism undergraduate program, and is available in online format only, having dropped its print edition in Spring 2014. There is also a digital archive of the newspaper's content from 1914 to 2013 published online by the university. The first publication at Richmond College was initiated by the Philologian Society and Mu Sigma Rho (the two literary organizations) in January 1876 as Monthly Musings, which was a monthly newspaper with a focus on literary articles, among other lesser topics. In January 1878, Monthly Musings was renamed to The Messenger. In 1914, when The Collegian was started, The Messenger fully moved to literary topics and continues today as a literary magazine at the University of Richmond.

References

External links
 Official site

University of Richmond
Student newspapers published in Virginia
Publications established in 1914
1914 establishments in Virginia